Sidney Offit (born October 13, 1928) is an American writer. He is perhaps best known as the author of various children's books during the 1960s, including The Adventures of Homer Fink, illustrated by Paul Galdone. In 1971, Boys' Life wrote that "more than a few of BL's millions of readers must be among the millions who know Mr. Offit's books for young readers: The Adventures of Homer Fink, Soupbone, Cadet Attack, and Cadet Quarterback." Offit is currently the President of the Authors Guild Foundation, and teaches fiction writing at The New School, for which he was recognized in 2001 with a Distinguished Teaching Award. For decades, he has been a member of both the Century Association and PEN American Center, serving a number of terms on the latter's Board of Trustees. For 32 years, he was also curator of the George Polk Awards in Journalism.

As a fixture of the New York literary scene during latter half of the 20th century, Offit befriended many of the era's most-celebrated writers, including Robert Caro, Ralph Ellison, Joseph Heller and Kurt Vonnegut. Offit, who appears at the "clambake" in Vonnegut's semi-autobiographical novel Timequake, has reminisced about their close friendship in various fora, and edited the Library of America's collection of the late author's novels and short stories. He also provided the foreword to Look at the Birdie, a volume of fourteen previously unpublished short stories by Vonnegut.

Offit himself is the author of two novels, ten books for younger readers, and two memoirs. His latest book, Friends, Writers and Other Countrymen: A Memoir, describes his encounters with figures like H. L. Mencken, Robert Frost, Che Guevara, and Truman Capote.

Early life
Offit was born to Jewish parents, Barney Offit and Lillian Cohen, in Baltimore, Maryland. He attended Valley Forge Military Academy and College and later studied at Johns Hopkins University, where he was also editor of The Johns Hopkins News-Letter. After graduating with a B.A. in English Literature in 1950, he moved to New York City. In the early 1950s, Offit married Avodah Komito, the daughter of a civil engineer and the proprietor of the Aladdin, a Borscht Belt hotel in Woodbourne, New York. Together, the couple had two sons, Kenneth and Michael.

Career
Offit began his literary career in the early 1950s as an editorial assistant at Mercury Publications and McFadden Publishers. In 1955, he became a contributing editor at Baseball Magazine, and the following year assembled The Best of Baseball, a collection of some of the publication's most celebrated stories from previous decades. During his summers he worked at the Aladdin, the hotel owned by his in-laws in the Catskills. His experiences there formed the basis of his 1959 debut novel, He Had It Made. Offit landed an appearance on Tonight Starring Jack Paar to promote the book, and though he produced one more novel—1962's The Other Side of the Street—he soon found greater success as a writer of children's books, which he published at a prodigious rate through the end of the decade. His stories covered topics ranging from sports to Greek mythology, and featured artwork by illustrators like Peter Burchard (Cadet Attack), Paul Galdone (The Adventures of Homer Fink), and Mercer Mayer (The Boy Who Made a Million). During this same period Offit began teaching fiction writing at both New York University and The New School. In 1972, he was appointed curator of the annual George Polk Awards in Journalism at Long Island University.

In 1975, Offit began appearing with Martin Abend for a nightly op-ed debate on the 10 pm. WNEW-TV (now WNYW) newscast. "Professor Offit" represented the liberal viewpoint against the arch-conservative Abend in heated back-and-forths about social, economic, and political issues. Their debates, which often degenerated into outrageous ad hominem attacks, were said to be part of the inspiration for Saturday Night Live's "Point/Counterpoint" sketch featuring Jane Curtin and Dan Aykroyd. The Offit-Abend debates were a regular feature of the 10 o'clock news until 1985, though they were briefly revived on Channel 11 in 1992.

Following the 1977 publication of a young adult novel, What Kind of Guy Do You Think I Am?, Offit took an almost twenty-year hiatus from long-form writing. He returned in 1995, however, with Memoir of the Bookie's Son, an extended reflection on his relationship with his father, a notorious Depression-era Baltimore bookie. The memoir was a hit, and was well received by critics and proclaimed "recommended reading" by The New Yorker.

In 1999, Offit was awarded an honorary degree from Long Island University – Brooklyn.

Bibliography 
 (1959) He Had It Made
 (1960) The Boy who Won the World Series
 (1962) The Other Side of the Street 
 (1962) Cadet Command
 (1963) Soupbone – "Adding fantasy (in the form of a gimmick which makes objects invisible) to baseball, Sidney Offit has come up with a story which will delight and amuse young fans."
 (1964) Cadet Attack – "Excellent – much information about an exciting sport, plus sharp insight into one boy's mind."
 (1965) Topsy Turvy 
 (1966) The Adventures of Homer Fink 
 (1968) The Boy Who Made a Million
 (1969) Cadet Quarterback – "Essentially a story of pre-collegiate football ... an exceptionally smooth narrative, with enough gridiron detail and off-the-field action to hold the most reluctant reader as well as avid high school sports fans."
 (1971) Not All Girls Have Million Dollar Smiles
 (1972) Only a Girl Like You
 (1977) What Kind of Guy Do You Think I Am?
 (1995) Memoir of the Bookie's Son – "A journeyman author recounts his coming of age under the guidance of an admirable outlaw father.  A son's personal recollection that may strike a chord for others."
 (2008) Friends, Writers, and Other Countrymen: A Memoir – "Second volume of recollections from Offit ... Like a summary of an intimate cocktail party someone held for his 1,001 closest friends."

References

External links

 Sidney Offit papers 1932–2002 at Johns Hopkins Libraries

1928 births
Living people
Writers from Maryland
Johns Hopkins University alumni